The Jeyranbatan Ultrafiltration Water Treatment Plants Complex is a water filtration plant in Baku, Azerbaijan. The plant, designed to supply Baku and the Absheron Peninsula with drinking water, was put into operation on October 28, 2015. The capacity of the Ultrafiltration (UF) treatment plant is 6.6 cubic meters per second (570 000 cubic meters per day). The plant complex was chosen as one of the most important water projects in the world at the Global Water Summit in Abu Dhabi in 2016. Companies from the US, Germany, Switzerland, Spain, Italy, Turkey and the Republic of Korea as well as up to 30 local contractor organizations were involved in the construction of the complex.

Treatment technology of the UF treatment plant 

The UF treatment plant processes water which is naturally purified in the Jeyranbatan reservoir with a capacity of 186 million cubic meters. The raw water is primarily treated in the coarse screen building by using 7Nos 3000-micron automatic self-cleaning filters. Water transmitted from the raw water tank is treated at the highest level within 20 seconds, passing through 200 micron filters first and then 0.02 micron filter modules. The treatment of the water is carried out in 5280 membrane filters. This process is performed in a mechanically closed environment by application of automation controls without implementing any chemical treatment and the natural mineral content of the water is fully preserved. Water produced in the plant meets the standards accepted by the World Health Organization as well as other international organizations.

Some quality indicators of water processed in the filters (chlorine residue, cloudiness, pH, TOC) are controlled online. More parameters of raw and treated water are studied and quality indicators are fully controlled in the laboratory of the complex. The volume and pressure of the water transmitted to the plant, each stage of the process of water, storing and transportation processes are fully automated. All technological processes are managed in the SCADA control center.

Processed water is collected in the treated water tank with a capacity of 10.000 cubic meters and is pumped to the Absheron reservoir, which is located at 118 meters above sea level, and water is distributed to the networks by gravity.

The Jeyranbatan-Zira transmission main, with a total length of 83,5km (DN1600-1000mm), and Saray, Balakhani, Ramana, Gala, and Zira reservoirs, with a total capacity of 90,000 cubic meters, which are located along the route of the Jeyranbatan-Zira transmission main, were constructed in order to provide water to Baku and other residential areas. More than 1 million inhabitants of the peninsula have been provided with high quality and sustainable drinking water by this infrastructure.

Structure of the UF treatment plant 

The UF treatment plant includes 5280 filter modules with a capacity of 1.25 L/sec each, 13 thousand valves and equipment, 116 pumps, 6 transformers, flow meters, backwash and chemical dosing pumps, ventilation, heating and cooling systems, energy block, generator, transformer, as well as working rooms, conference hall, and SCADA control room. 

3Nos intake pipelines (DN1600mm) were constructed for taking water from the reservoir by applying the tunnel boring machine method. A water distribution chamber was built on the shore of the reservoir in order to control volume of the supplied water and adjust raw water capacity to meet the needs of the plants. Four pipelines with a diameter of 1400 mm were laid from the water distribution chamber to the UF treatment plant.

30 km of pipelines in a varied diameter range, 242 km of electrical and 13 km of fiber optic cables, 7120 tons of rebar, 3000 tons of steel structure, and 65 thousand cubic meters of concrete were used during the construction of the complex. Approximately 700,000 cubic meters of earthworks were performed, 19500 square meters of area were covered with asphalt, and greenery work has been carried out in an area of 28000 square meters.

In 2021-2022 Ultrafiltration modules replaced with Akkim Akualys Ultrafiltration membranes.

Gallery

References

See also 
Azersu Open Joint Stock Company

Filtration
Water treatment
Membrane technology